Easter Kinkell is a rural village, in the parish of Urquhart and Logie Wester, in the area known as Black Isle, in the county of Ross-shire, Scottish Highlands. It is also in the Scottish council area of Highland.

Newton of Ferintosh lies directly southwest of the village.

References

Populated places on the Black Isle